The Canton of Oisemont  is a former canton in the department of the Somme and in the Picardy region of northern France. It was disbanded following the French canton reorganisation in March 2015. It consisted of 31 communes, which joined the canton of Poix-de-Picardie in 2015. It had 6,183 inhabitants (2012).

Geography 
The canton is organised around the commune of Oisemont in the arrondissement of Abbeville (arrondissement of Amiens before 2009). The altitude varies from 48m at Heucourt-Croquoison to 204m at Neuville-Coppegueule for an average of 118m. The canton's economy is almost entirely agricultural, only the chef-lieu having a population in excess of 1000.

The canton comprised 31 communes:

Andainville
Aumâtre
Avesnes-Chaussoy
Bermesnil
Cannessières
Épaumesnil
Étréjust
Fontaine-le-Sec
Forceville-en-Vimeu
Foucaucourt-Hors-Nesle
Fresnes-Tilloloy
Fresneville
Fresnoy-Andainville
Frettecuisse
Heucourt-Croquoison
Inval-Boiron
Lignières-en-Vimeu
Le Mazis
Mouflières
Nesle-l'Hôpital
Neslette
Neuville-au-Bois
Neuville-Coppegueule
Oisemont
Saint-Aubin-Rivière
Saint-Léger-sur-Bresle
Saint-Maulvis
Senarpont
Vergies
Villeroy
Woirel

Population

See also
 Arrondissements of the Somme department
 Cantons of the Somme department
 Communes of the Somme department

References

External links
 Oisemont, Trésor des régions 

Oisemont
2015 disestablishments in France
States and territories disestablished in 2015